In Distortion We Trust is the first album by Swedish band Crucified Barbara.
It was first released in Sweden in 2005.

History 
It was recorded in PAMA Studios/Blakk Records in Kristianopel in Sweden and produced and engineered by Mankan Sedenberg. The recordings were finished, mixed and mastered at the beginning of summer. The first single, "Losing the Game," and the accompanying video were released in December.

Track listing

References

External links 
Crucified Barbara Official site

2005 debut albums
Crucified Barbara albums